William McKenzie Anderson (12 February 1911 – 15 May 1971) was an Australian rules footballer who played with the Geelong Football Club in the Victorian Football League (VFL).

Family
The son of Donald James Anderson (1884–1944), and Ida Anderson (1881–1916), née Charity, William McKenzie Anderson was born at Geelong, Victoria, on 12 February 1911.

He married Dorothy Louisa Jeffreys in 1937. They had two children.

Death
He died at his residence in Ivanhoe, Victoria on 15 May 1971.

Notes

References
 
 World War Two Militia Service Record: William Mckenzie Anderson (444402), National Archives of Australia.

External links 
 
 
 William McKckenzie Anderson, at Find a Grave

1911 births
1971 deaths
Australian rules footballers from Victoria (Australia)
Geelong Football Club players
Barwon Football Club players
Australian military personnel of World War II